Accacoeliidae is a family of trematodes belonging to the order Plagiorchiida.

Genera:
 Accacladium Odhner, 1928
 Accacladocoelium Odhner, 1928
 Accacoelium Monticelli, 1893
 Odhnerium Yamaguti, 1934
 Orophocotyle Looss, 1902
 Paraccacladium Bray & Gibson, 1977
 Rhynchopharynx Odhner, 1928
 Rhyncopharynx
 Tetrochetus Looss, 1912

References

Plagiorchiida